Flabellina llerae is a species of sea slug, an aeolid nudibranch, a marine heterobranchia mollusc in the family Flabellinidae.

Description
F. llerae is seen in a variety of colours, usually white with either red, purple or blue.

Distribution 
F. llerae can be found in Cape Verdes.

References

Flabellinidae
Gastropods of Cape Verde
Gastropods described in 1989